The 1907 All-Ireland Senior Football Championship Final was the twentieth All-Ireland Final and the deciding match of the 1907 All-Ireland Senior Football Championship, an inter-county Gaelic football tournament for the top teams in Ireland. 

Dublin's train to Tipperary was delayed, so the match started late. They won convincingly, six points to two.

It was the fourth of five All-Ireland football titles won by Dublin in the 1900s.

References

Gaelic football
All-Ireland Senior Football Championship Finals
Cork county football team matches
Dublin county football team matches